Michael Coleman (June 24, 1956 – November 2, 2014) was a Chicago blues guitarist, singer, and songwriter. He was voted one of the top 50 bluesmen in the world by Guitar World magazine. He released five solo albums and worked with James Cotton, Aron Burton, Junior Wells, John Primer and Malik Yusef.

Biography
Coleman was born in 1956 in Chicago, Illinois. He began his musical career at a young age, playing alongside his father, Cleother "Baldhead Pete" Williams. As a teenager he played with the Top 40 showband Midnight Sun and with the blues musicians Aron Burton and Johnny Dollar on Chicago's North Side. In 1975 he became a full-time professional musician. He toured Europe with Eddy Clearwater four years later. This led to work for James Cotton, in whose band Coleman played for almost ten years. Coleman backed Cotton on three albums, including Live from Chicago: Mr. Superharp Himself, released by Alligator Records.

Coleman backed Junior Wells, Buster Benton, and Jimmy Dawkins and also worked with Syl Johnson in the 1980s. He embarked on a solo career in the early 1990s. His 1987 song "Woman Loves a Woman" contained a controversial lyric, in which he confessed he was in love with a woman, but "She's in love with a woman too". Coleman formed the Backbreakers as his backing ensemble in 1991. His album Shake Your Booty was released by the Austrian label Wolf Records in 1995.

His U.S. debut album was Do Your Thing!, issued by Delmark Records in 2000. It featured a mixture of material encompassing blues, soul and funk, with cover versions of songs previously recorded by Jimmy Reed, Otis Redding and Isaac Hayes. It was noted that the quality of his guitar playing compensated for a lightweight vocal accompaniment.

In 2006, Coleman led a group of Delmark musicians on the album Blues Brunch at the Mart.<ref>{{cite web|url=|title=Allmusic ((( Blues Brunch at the Mart > Michael Coleman > Review )))}}</ref>

Coleman was overweight and had diabetes, which severely affected his health. His doctor advised a change in lifestyle, and Coleman subsequently lost 150 pounds. He started his 2010 Chicago Blues Tour by performing at Rosa's Lounge in Chicago.

Coleman died in November 2014, aged 58.

Discography

Albums

Selected work with other musicians
 High Compression, James Cotton (1984)
 Live from Chicago Mr. Superharp Himself, James Cotton (1986)
 Harp Attack!, James Cotton (1990)
 Poor Man Blues, John Primer (1991)
 The Great Chicago Fire: A Cold Day in Hell'', Malik Yusef (2003)
 "Wouldn't You Like to Ride", Malik Yusef (2005)

See also
List of Chicago blues musicians
List of electric blues musicians
List of soul-blues musicians

References

1956 births
2014 deaths
African-American guitarists
American blues guitarists
American blues singers
American funk guitarists
American male guitarists
American funk singers
Soul-blues musicians
Songwriters from Illinois
Electric blues musicians
Chicago blues musicians
Singers from Chicago
Guitarists from Chicago
20th-century American guitarists
20th-century American male musicians
Black & Blue Records artists
African-American songwriters
20th-century African-American musicians
21st-century African-American people
American male songwriters